Probathylepas is a genus of acorn barnacles in the family Probathylepadidae, the sole genus of the family. There is one described species in Probathylepas, P. faxian.

References

Barnacles